Natalie Fulton (born 17 May 1977), also known as Natalie Haynes, is a former South Africa women's field hockey international. She represented South Africa at the 2002 Women's Hockey World Cup and at the 2004 Summer Olympics. Her husband, Craig Fulton, and her brother-in-law, Grant Fulton, were both South Africa men's field hockey internationals. In 2004 Fulton and her husband became the first married couple to represent South Africa at the same Olympic Games.

Early years and education
Natalie was educated at Mowat Park High School in Montclair, Durban and at Stellenbosch University.

Domestic teams

Chelmsford
Natalie played for Chelmsford in the Women's England Hockey League while her partner and future husband, Craig Fulton was player/coach of the men's team in the Men's England Hockey League. In September 2002, while the couple were in Pretoria, they interrupted a suspected burglar at their home. Craig was hospitalised after he was reportedly stabbed or slashed seven times during the incident.

Pembroke Wanderers
In 2005 when her husband, Craig Fulton, was appointed director of coaching and player/coach to the senior men's team at Pembroke Wanderers, Natalie began playing for the Wanderers women's team. In 2007, together with Mary Goode, she was a member of the Wanderers women's team that lost 1–0 to Pegasus in the Irish Senior Cup final. She was also a member of the Wanderers women's team that finished as runners up in the 2008 European Cup Winners Cup. Between 2007 and 2010 Fulton was player/coach of the women's team.
After her husband was appointed the coach of the Ireland men's national field hockey team, Fulton re-joined the Wanderers women's team for the 2015–16 Women's Irish Hockey League season.

South Africa international
Fulton represented South Africa at the 2002 Commonwealth Games, the 2002 Women's Hockey World Cup and at the 2004 Summer Olympics. Her husband, Craig Fulton, and her brother-in-law, Grant Fulton, were both South Africa men's field hockey internationals. In 2004 Fulton and her husband became the first married couple to represent South Africa at the same Olympic Games.

Coach

University of Pretoria
Fulton has served as club manager at University of Pretoria.

Honours
Pembroke Wanderers
European Cup Winners Cup
Runners Up: 2008: 1
Irish Senior Cup
Runners Up: 2007: 1

References

External links

1977 births
Living people
South African female field hockey players
South African field hockey coaches
Olympic field hockey players of South Africa
Field hockey players at the 2002 Commonwealth Games
Field hockey players at the 2004 Summer Olympics
Pembroke Wanderers Hockey Club players
Women's Irish Hockey League players
Women's England Hockey League players
South African expatriate sportspeople in Ireland
South African expatriate sportspeople in England
Sportspeople from Durban
Expatriate field hockey players
Stellenbosch University alumni
Commonwealth Games competitors for South Africa